Duvbo metro station is a station on the blue line of the Stockholm metro, located in Central Sundbyberg in Sundbyberg Municipality. It is named after the nearby Duvbo area. The station was inaugurated on 18 August 1985 as part of the extension to between Västra skogen and Rinkeby. It became the 98th station of Stockholm metro.

Gallery

References

External links
Images of Duvbo

Blue line (Stockholm metro) stations
Railway stations opened in 1985
1985 establishments in Sweden